Robert Anae (born December 21, 1958) is an American football coach and former player who is currently serving as the offensive coordinator (OC) for NC State since December 2022. Prior to NC State, he was the OC at the University of Virginia and Brigham Young University (BYU), his alma mater, each under head coach Bronco Mendenhall, and as the OC at Syracuse under head coach Dino Babers.

Career

Early life and playing career
Anae is of Samoan descent and grew up in Laie, Hawaii before graduating from Kahuku High School. He served as a missionary for the Church of Jesus Christ of Latter-day Saints in Tulsa, Oklahoma from 1978 to 1980. He attended BYU and played football for the Cougars, switching from center to offensive guard. He was part of BYU's 1984 National Championship team, and also played in the Holiday Bowl each year from 1981 to 1984, as part of four Western Athletic Conference (WAC) championship squads. Anae was second-team All-WAC as a senior and played in the Hula Bowl before being drafted in the third round of the 1985 USFL Draft by the New Jersey Generals.

Coaching career
Anae began as offensive line coach at University of Hawaii in 1986 and continued through the next year.  He came back to BYU for 1990 and 1991 as an offensive line graduate assistant and followed up at Ricks College from 1992 through 1995 as its offensive line coach. He coached offensive line at Boise State University in 1996, University of Nevada, Las Vegas (UNLV) in 1997 and 1998, and Texas Tech University from 2000 to 2004. In 2005, he returned to BYU where he served as OC until his resignation Dec. 30, 2010.

Arizona
Anae served the 2011-12 season as the offensive line coach and running game coordinator at the University of Arizona, under head coaches Mike Stoops and Rich Rodriguez. In January 2013, Anae returned to BYU as the OC.

Virginia
On December 9, 2015, Anae announced he had accepted the OC position at the University of Virginia, going from BYU with Bronco Mendenhall who was appointed the university's new head football coach. Anae left this position  after Mendenhall announced his retirement from the head coaching job.

Syracuse
Anae was hired as Syracuse's OC on December 26, 2021.

Personal life
Anae's father, Famika, and brothers, Brad and Matt, also played for BYU. His son, Famika, was a BYU offensive lineman before ending his career due to injures in 2012.

References

External links
 Syracuse profile
 Virginia profile
 BYU profile

Living people
1958 births
American football centers
American football offensive guards
American sportspeople of Samoan descent
People from Laie
American Mormon missionaries in the United States
Arizona Wildcats football coaches
Boise State Broncos football coaches
BYU Cougars football coaches
BYU Cougars football players
Hawaii Rainbow Warriors football players
Latter Day Saints from Hawaii
Players of American football from Hawaii
Ricks Vikings football coaches
Texas Tech Red Raiders football coaches
UNLV Rebels football coaches
Virginia Cavaliers football coaches
Syracuse Orange football coaches
21st-century Mormon missionaries